Chris Julian Irwin (born November 12, 1957), known professionally as Chris Julian, is an American film and music producer.

Musical career
Julian is classically trained in voice, trombone and timpani. As a contemporary engineer, session player, producer and arranger he plays guitar, bass, strings, horns, and keyboards, and arranges, records, and programs samples and drum loops. He has produced songs for artists ranging from Stetsasonic to Jimmy Webb. Julian toured as a lead singer for six years around the United States with his rock band.

Calliope Productions
In 1984, Julian, with partners Fortunato Procopio and Joe Teig, founded Calliope Productions, a New York City based recording studio and production company. The studio became the center for the East Coast hip hop movement known as the "Native Tongues." Julian collaborated with hip hop artists such as De La Soul, Biz Markie, Naughty by Nature, Deee-lite, Tribe Called Quest, 3rd Bass, and P.M. Dawn, "forging a new African American roots awareness, and a progressive, brainy, 'hippy' sensibility within the hip hop community." As producer, composer, engineer, writer, and instrumentalist, Julian's work spanned several genres as he collaborated with celebrities Don Was, Manny Marroquin, Jimmy Webb, Art Garfunkel, Chaka Khan, David Bowie, Isaac Hayes, Vanessa Williams, and David Crosby. Calliope closed its doors in 1994.

BANG Music
Julian was the co-owner and co-founder of BANG Music, a youth oriented commercial music production company. At BANG, Julian and his colleagues wrote and produced commercials for Coca-Cola, Pepsi, Mercedes Benz, Anheuser-Busch, Ford, Burger King, The American Cancer Society, Procter & Gamble, Sony, and other national sponsors.

Awards
Julian won an Emmy "For Outstanding Sound Editing For A Mini-Series, Movie, or Special" in 2006 for his work on the A&E TV film, Flight 93.

Music industry

Film industry

References

External links
Imagine Post Official Website

Chris Julian Official Website

Living people
1957 births
Musicians from Boston
People from Westfield, New Jersey
Syracuse University alumni